First Lady of Israel is the unofficial title of the wife of the president of Israel. The current first lady of Israel is Michal Herzog, wife of President Isaac Herzog.

History
There is no official role or office of the first lady of Israel, although President Reuven Rivlin bestowed the title of First Lady on his wife, Nechama Rivlin, shortly after taking office in 2014.

First ladies of Israel

See also
 Spouse of the prime minister of Israel

References

Israel